Paul Dubois may refer to:

Paul Dubois (sculptor) (1829–1905), French sculptor
Paul Antoine Dubois (1795–1871), French obstetrician
Paul Charles Dubois (1848–1918), Swiss neuropathologist
Paul Dubois (diplomat) (born 1943), Canadian ambassador to Germany
Paul Élie Dubois, French Orientalist painter
Paul Du Bois (1859–1938), Belgian sculptor